The Macaulay River is a river of the Mackenzie Country of New Zealand's South Island. It flows south from the Two Thumb Range, part of the Southern Alps, its valley merging with that of the Godley River shortly before it enters the northern end of Lake Tekapo.

See also
List of rivers of New Zealand

References

Rivers of Canterbury, New Zealand
Rivers of New Zealand